The New Hampshire State Register of Historic Places (NHSRHP) is a register of historic places administered by the state of New Hampshire and the New Hampshire Division of Historical Resources. Buildings, districts, sites, landscapes (such as cemeteries, parks or town forests), structures, or objects can be added to the register. The register was initiated in 2001 and is authorized by RSA 227 C:33.

, there were 406 properties in the State Register, 54 of which were also in the National Register of Historic Places. In some instances, the State Register lists multiple buildings individually, while the same buildings are encompassed by a single entry in the National Register—two such examples are the Hebron Village Historic District and the Waumbek Cottages Historic District. Bennington and Francestown, neighboring towns in Hillsborough County, each have 35 properties listed in the State Register, the most of any town or city. An unknown number of properties were formerly in the State Register, but have been de-listed.

Once a property is listed, there are no restrictions or requirements imposed by the state, and owners can maintain, manage or demolish the property as they choose. However, any change that harms or destroys its historical significance can result in removal from the register.

Criteria
Sites eligible for listing are those that possess any of the following:
ability to tell the story of a significant event or a longer historical trend;
relation to a person who made important contributions to a community, profession or local tradition;
tangible merit, such as well-preserved example of local architecture, building methods, etc.;
identified, but unexcavated and unevaluated archeological site.

Properties listed in the New Hampshire State Register of Historic Places may also be recognized in the National Register of Historic Places, be listed as a National Historic Landmark, or listed as a contributing property in a National Historic District.

Properties listed
The following table is a partial list of properties in the New Hampshire State Register of Historic Places. The New Hampshire Division of Historical Resources is the agency responsible for overseeing the State Register, and other state historic preservation programs. All properties added to the State Register through July 2012 are listed; more recently added properties are incomplete.

 Property is also listed in the National Register of Historic Places.

 Property is a subset or superset of a listing in the National Register of Historic Places.

Notes

See also
National Register of Historic Places listings in New Hampshire
List of National Historic Landmarks in New Hampshire

References

External links
 New Hampshire State Register of Historic Places home page